Rogers Olipa (born 28 December 2001) is a Ugandan cricketer. In May 2019, he was named in Uganda's squad for the Regional Finals of the 2018–19 ICC T20 World Cup Africa Qualifier tournament in Uganda. He made his Twenty20 International (T20I) debut for Uganda against Kenya on 22 May 2019. In July 2019, he was one of twenty-five players named in the Ugandan training squad, ahead of the Cricket World Cup Challenge League fixtures in Hong Kong.

References

External links
 

2001 births
Living people
Ugandan cricketers
Uganda Twenty20 International cricketers
Place of birth missing (living people)